Vince Stroth (born November 25, 1960) is a former American football tackle and guard. He played for the Arizona Wranglers in 1983, the Chicago Blitz in 1984, the New Jersey Generals and San Francisco 49ers in 1985 and for the Houston Oilers from 1987 to 1988.

References

1960 births
Living people
American football offensive tackles
American football offensive guards
BYU Cougars football players
Arizona Wranglers players
Chicago Blitz players
New Jersey Generals players
San Francisco 49ers players
Houston Oilers players